RBL may refer to:

 RBL Bank, an Indian bank
 RBL cells, cells used in the study of allergy
 RBL Posse, a hip hop group from San Francisco, California
 RB Leipzig, a German football club
 Real-time Blackhole List or DNSBL, a list of IP addresses most often used to publish addresses linked to spamming
 Reasonable benefit limits, a limit on Australian retirement benefits
 Research Bureau Limited, the former name of Research International
 Rifled breech loader, a type of artillery
 Rogers Broadcasting Limited, a Canadian broadcasting company owned and operated by Rogers Communications
 The Royal British Legion, a British charity
 Rubber band ligation, an outpatient treatment for internal hemorrhoids
 Miraya Bikol (ISO 639 code: rbl), a variety of the Albay Bikol language
 Red Bluff Municipal Airport (FAA LID: RBL), an airport in California, United States
 "Rbl", an abbreviation for the Belarusian ruble